The I.Ae.24 Calquin (a Mapudungun word which means "Royal Eagle") was a tactical bomber designed and built by the Instituto Aerotécnico at Córdoba, in Argentina in the immediate post-World War II era.  Although superficially a "look-alike" for the de Havilland Mosquito, the I.Ae.24 was powered by twin Pratt & Whitney R-1830-G “Twin Wasp” radials giving it a distinct appearance.  After an operational career spanning two decades, the Calquin was retired.

Design and development
Patterned after the successful de Havilland Mosquito, the Calquín had a wooden structure similar to the FMA AeMB.2, and was the first twin-engined aircraft designed and built in Argentina. The I.Ae.24 design was based on a cantilever mid-mounted  wooden (indigenous woods were used throughout) wings with fabric-covered flying surfaces.  The conventional main twin-oleo undercarriage retracted into the engine nacelles while the tailwheel retracted into the aft fuselage.  The two-man crew were seated side by side under a large transparency constructed partly of acrylic glass with glass panels.  The armament consisted of four 12.7 mm machine guns grouped in the nose.  Some examples later had four 20 mm cannons and an internal bombload of 1,764 lb (800 kg) kg along with 12 rockets (75 mm) mounted under the wings.

Originally the I.Ae. 24 was also intended to be equipped with Rolls-Royce Merlins but an adequate supply of the powerplants was not possible, consequently Pratt & Whitney R-1830-G “Twin Wasp” radials of 1,050 hp (782.5 kW) were substituted.  Performance estimates of a Merlin-powered variant would have made it comparable to the Mosquito but the R-1830-powered prototype was able to achieve only 273 mph (440 km/h), making the aircraft unstable and prone to stalling. A later prototype, the I.Ae.28 was equipped with Rolls-Royce Merlins but the project was superseded by the more capable I.Ae. 30 "Ñancú".

Operational history
Despite the lower performance obtained in testing, the I.Ae.24 Calquin was able to undertake an attack and light bombing role, replacing the Northrop A-17 in the Argentine Air Force inventory.  A total of 100 aircraft were ordered, with the first production example flying on 4 July 1946. Fifty pilots and crew members were killed in accidents related to Calquín operational service and trials. Test pilots considered the aircraft unstable "on all three axes" and required careful handling. Series production was completed by 1950, with operational service continuing until 1957 although a small number of aircraft were still in squadron use until 1960.

Operators

Argentine Air Force

Variants
I.Ae.24 "Calquín" "early" had 4 x 12.7 mm browning ML or DL nationally manufactured heavy machine guns along with bomb ordnance.

I.Ae.24 "Calquín" "late" had 4 x 20 mm Hispano-Suiza 804 automatic cannons along with bomb and rocket ordnance.

I.Ae.28 "Super Calquín"Evolved variant of the Calquin with Merlin engines and a look similar to the de Havilland "Mosquito", had a gunner and 4 - 6 x 20 mm cannons. Only a wooden mockup built. Led to the development of the I.Ae. 30 Ñancú.

Specifications (I.Ae.24 "Calquín")

See also
Comparable aircraft
de Havilland Mosquito

Footnotes

References

Notes

Bibliography
 Burzaco, Ricardo. "I.Ae. 24 Calquin." Aeroespacio, Nro. 52, November–December 1997.
 Burzaco, Ricardo. Las Alas de Perón: Aeronaútica Argentina 1945/1960 . Buenos Aires: Ed. Da Vinci, 1995. .
 
 Janes's All the World's Aircraft 1957-1958. London: Jane's All the World's Aircraft, 1958.
 Taylor, John W. R., and Jean Alexander. Combat Aircraft of the World. New York: G.P. Putnam's Sons, 1969. .
 Taylor, Michael J.H. Janes's Encyclopedia of Aviation, Vol. 4. Danbury, Connecticut: Grolier Educational Corporation, 1980. .

Further reading

External links

 I.Ae.24 "Calquin" (in Polish)
 I.Ae.24 "Calquin" (translated into English from Spanish)
 Aircraft history and specifications (in Spanish)
 Aircraft history, specifications and colour images (in Spanish)
 Pre-series testing by the "Grupo Experimental de Vuelo" (in Spanish)

1940s Argentine bomber aircraft
IAe024
Mid-wing aircraft
Aircraft first flown in 1946
Twin piston-engined tractor aircraft